Aaron Carter is the debut studio album by American pop singer Aaron Carter, brother of Backstreet Boys member Nick Carter. It was originally released in November 1997 in Europe and re-released the next year with a new song and a remix, as well as being released in the United States in the summer of 1998.

The album reached the top 10 in some European countries and reached number 12 in the United Kingdom. While it did not chart on the US Billboard 200, it did manage to reach number 17 on the US Top Heatseekers chart, and sold more than 100,000 copies in the United States.

Three singles were released from the album; "Crush on You", a cover of the Jets' 1985 song, "Crazy Little Party Girl", and "I'm Gonna Miss You Forever". Other songs were released as limited edition singles in some regions. "Crush on You" and "Crazy Little Party Girl" went top 10 and 20 respectively in Australia, while both went top 10 in the UK. All three singles went top 20 in Germany and Sweden, with "I'm Gonna Miss You Forever" peaking at number 24 on the UK Singles Chart.

"Surfin' USA", a cover of the 1963 song by the Beach Boys, was later included on the re-release edition of the album, and released separately as an EP, and went top 20 in the UK and Germany.

The album sold more than one million copies worldwide.

Track listing
All tracks produced by Gary Carolla, except "Swing It Out" by Veit Renn.

Re-released in July 1998 with "Surfin' USA" (Main Mix) and "Surfin' USA" (Johnny Jam and Delgado Mix)

Other versions
The Japanese version of the album includes the bonus tracks:
"Crush on You" (Remix)
"Crazy Little Party Girl" (One Day Mix)
"I'm Gonna Miss You Forever" (Dreamix)
"Shake It" (Nick Carter Radio Remix)

The Canadian version has a different cover and includes a poster (different from the one that came with the German version) and has the same track listing but without "Intro".

There was also a limited edition bonus CD pack available, and with it came cards, stickers, and a bonus CD featuring:
"Crush on You" (Gary's Mix)
"Crazy Little Party Girl" (Main Mix)
"I'm Gonna Miss You Forever" (Dreamix)
"Shake It" (Nick Carter Radio Remix)
"Surfin' USA" (album version)
"Crazy Little Interview"

Singles
 "Crush on You" (1997)
 "Crazy Little Party Girl" (1997)
 "I'm Gonna Miss You Forever" (1998)
 "Surfin' USA" (1998; released as a single/EP and included on the US edition and later on the re-release)
"Shake It" (featuring 95 South) was also released as a single in Australia and New Zealand, charting in both; at number 44 in New Zealand, and below the top 50 at number 66 in Australia.

Personnel
Aaron Carter – vocals, main performer
Mark Matteo, Tony Battaglia – guitar
Mark Goff, Janice Brocking Renn, Greg Whipple, David Nicoll, Michelle Lindahl, Carlos Spencer, Article Bartley – background vocals
Dexter Redding – bass guitar
Freddie Mollings – scratching, bass guitar
Don Rogozinski, Pat Gullotta, John M. Robinson – horn
Brian Snapp – flute, horn
Gary Carolla – drums, keyboards, background vocals, producer
Veit Renn – background vocals, producer
Johnny Wright – executive producer
Don Rogozinski, Michael Tucker – engineers, digital editing
Adam Barber – engineer
Femio Hernandez, Jim Porecca, Alan Armitage – assistant engineers
Joe Smith – mixing
Neils Kastor and Jorge M. Jaramillo also contributed.

Charts

Weekly charts

Year-end charts

Certifications and sales

References

1997 debut albums
Aaron Carter albums
Edel Music albums